The Premise is an American anthology series created by B. J. Novak. It premiered on FX on Hulu on September 16, 2021. In February 2023, the series was cancelled after one season.

Synopsis 
Each episode tells a single character driven story about a current world situated issue.

Episodes

Production 
In July 2019, FX ordered a two-episode pilot order for an anthology created by B. J. Novak and produced by FXP. In May 2020, FX picked up the series. Lucas Hedges, Kaitlyn Dever, Jon Bernthal, and Boyd Holbrook were cast for pilot episodes in 2019 while Ben Platt, Tracee Ellis Ross, and Daniel Dae Kim, among others, were announced to be starring in the series in August 2021. During the summer TCA press tour, Novak shed light on his efforts to cast Jack Nicholson in the series and explained that they had scrapped the episode after they couldn't cast him. Music is by Emily Bear and Brooke Blair. On February 15, 2023, FX on Hulu cancelled the series after one season.

Release 
The series premiered on September 16, 2021, on FX on Hulu in the United States. Internationally, the series is available through Disney+ under the dedicated streaming hub Star in select markets whereas Disney+ Hotstar premiered the series in India on September 17, 2021.

Reception 
The review aggregator website Rotten Tomatoes reports a 41% approval rating with an average rating of 5.6/10, based on 17 critic reviews. The website's critics consensus reads, "A mixed bag of good intentions that ultimately falls flat, The Premises attempts to grapple with complex social issues aren't funny enough to work as satire, but lack the dramatic heft necessary to be satisfying melodrama." Metacritic gave the series a weighted average score of 53 out of 100 based on 14 critic reviews, indicating "mixed or average reviews".

References

External links 
 

2020s American drama television series
2020s American anthology television series
2021 American television series debuts
2021 American television series endings
English-language television shows
FX on Hulu original programming